Big Al Brewing is a brewery in White Center, Washington, USA. It was started in August 2008 by Alejandro Brown with a Belgian-style wheat beer and an Irish red ale. The brewery is located in Pacific Rim Brewing's former facility. It features a tasting room and lounge.

As of 2009, the beer was available at over 70 bars and restaurants in the Puget Sound region. Since Brown began brewing at home himself, Big Al Brewing has produced beers from the winners of contests in an effort to promote home brewing. The brewery has also partnered with the Emerald City Supporters to release a beer for fans of Seattle Sounders FC.

See also
 Beer in the United States

References

External links

 Big Al Brewing, company website

Beer brewing companies based in Washington (state)